The High Flying Birds Tour was the debut solo concert tour by Noel Gallagher's High Flying Birds, which took place in 2011 and 2012. The tour was in promotion of the album Noel Gallagher's High Flying Birds.

Background
The tour kicked off on 23 October with a sold out show at The Olympia Theatre in Dublin before moving onto Great Britain for a short theatre leg. The band then moved onto North America in November for a short run of shows in the United States and Canada before returning to mainland Europe for another show leg. The band will then make their way to Asia for two shows in Japan before heading to Oceania for some festival shows and two headlining shows in Sydney and Melbourne. In February 2012, he kicked off his biggest ever headlining solo shows with a full arena tour in venues across Ireland and Great Britain accompanied by the Crouch End Festival Chorus, Hertfordshire Chorus and a three piece brass section. The band returned once again to North America in March and April which also included appearances in Mexico, and in May a run of gigs in South America was followed by a return to Asia. Summer 2012 saw Noel Gallagher entering the eastern European bloc of Russia, Ukraine and Poland for the first time in his performing career. There was also support given to Red Hot Chili Peppers in front of 80,000 people at Croke Park in Dublin during the festival run.

Support acts
The Minutes – (Leg 1; Dublin)
The Electric Soft Parade – (Leg 1; United Kingdom, select dates), (Leg 3; Europe, select dates)
Murray James – (Leg 1; United Kingdom, select dates)
Folks – (Leg 1; United Kingdom, select dates), (Leg 7; Europe, select dates)
Cesar & Parker – (Leg 3; Europe, select date)
Deep Sea Arcade – (Leg 6; Australia, Sydney)
Immigrant Union – (Leg 6; Australia, Melbourne)
Reverend and The Makers – (Leg 7; Manchester, Aberdeen, Glasgow, Sheffield, London & Birmingham)
Cashier No.9 – (Leg 7; Dublin & Belfast)
Kasabian – (Dublin; Marlay Park)
The Cribs – (Dublin; Marlay Park)
Maverick Sabre – (Dublin; Marlay Park)
Snow Patrol – (Leg 11; North America)

Set list
The band's typical setlist is:

"(It's Good) To Be Free"
"Mucky Fingers" replaced by D'Yer Wanna Be A Spaceman from 4 September 2012
"Everybody's on the Run"
"Dream On"
"If I Had a Gun..."
"The Good Rebel"
"The Death of You and Me"
"Freaky Teeth"
"Wonderwall" replaced by Whatever from February 2012
"Supersonic"
"D'Yer Wanna Be A Spaceman" replaced Mucky Fingers from 4 September 2012
"(I Wanna Live in a Dream in My) Record Machine"
"AKA... What a Life!"
"Talk Tonight"
"Soldier Boys and Jesus Freaks"
"AKA… Broken Arrow"
"Half the World Away"
"A Simple Game of Genius" 29 May 2012
"(Stranded On) The Wrong Beach"

Encore:

"Whatever" replaced Wonderwall from February 2012
"Little By Little"
"The Importance of Being Idle" replaced by Let the Lord Shine a Light on Me from May 2012 and moved to song No. 1 in the encore
"Don't Look Back in Anger"

Credits:
 All tracks written by Noel Gallagher

The setlist comprises around half and half of songs from the High Flying Birds album and from Noel Gallagher's Oasis back catalogue with new track "Freaky Teeth" being played without having an official release. At the beginning of the tour "Little By Little" and "Don’t Look Back in Anger" swapped positions in the encore with "Don't Look Back in Anger" being changed from an acoustic version to the last song with a full band version.

For the two Tokyo gigs in January 2012 an acoustic version of "Whatever" was added to the encore due to the popularity of the song in Japan and the song was also played in Melbourne. "Whatever" was added permanently to the setlist in place of "Wonderwall" when the band returned to Europe in March 2012 although "Whatever" was instead played as the first song of a four-song encore, this version of "Whatever" was played with the full band.

In May 2012 the band played the B-Side "Let the Lord Shine a Light on Me" for the first time.

On 29 May 2012, the same day of Gallagher's birthday, the band played the digital download edition and Japanese bonus track "A Simple Game of Genius" for the first time.

On 4 September 2012, Gallagher played "D'Yer Wanna Be A Spaceman" for the first time, he has continued to play the song since including it in the setlist for the iTunes Festival gig and has subsequently replaced the song "Mucky Fingers" with it. He plays the song in his acoustic set with a majority of his band.

On 9 November "Idler's Dream" was performed for the first time.

Song statistics 
In total, the band performed 34 different songs across the tour.

Tour dates

Festivals and other miscellaneous performances

Box office score data

Credits

Band
Noel Gallagher: Lead vocals & Guitar
Russ Pritchard: Bass & Vocals
Tim Smith: Guitar & Vocals
Mikey Rowe: Keyboards
Jeremy Stacey: Drums

Crew

Doe Phillips: Tour Manager
Michael O'Connor: Production Manager
Roni Horner: Production Coordinator
Kevin Fallows: Tour Security
Jason Rhodes: Guitar & Bass Technician
Mickey Winder: Guitar & Drums Technician
Ben Leach: Keyboard Technician & Additional Keyboards
Antony King: Front of House Engineer

Nahuel Gutierrez: Monitor Engineer
David "Fuji" Convertino: Lighting Designer
Phil Smith: DJ
Scully: Merchandiser
Luke Chadwick: Sound Technician (London)
Barry Macleod: Sound Technician (Europe)
Vince Buller: Sound Technician (USA East Coast)
Chris Malmgren: Sound Technician (USA West Coast)

Management

Ignition Management
Marcus Russell
Alec McKinlay
Kat Killingley
Natalie Hicks

Ray McCarville
Carly Garrod
Fiona Melville
Karin Struijk

References

External links 
 noelgallagher.com

2011 concert tours
2012 concert tours
Noel Gallagher's High Flying Birds